Günter Simon (born Großbaudis, Liegnitz 6 May 1933) is a German journalist.

Life

Early years
Born the son of an agricultural worker in Lower Silesia, Simon received an education that included lower, middle and upper schools, successfully obtaining his Abitur. By this time the German Democratic Republic had come into being, based on what had previously been the Soviet occupation zone. The frontier dividing Germany from Poland had moved west, and Simon was among the millions of Germans who had been relocated as part of the process. He joined East Germany's ruling SED (party) in 1950. He studied Journalism at Leipzig University between 1952 and 1955, emerging with a university-level qualification in journalism.

The journalist
He served an apprenticeship with the newspaper Neuer Tag in Frankfurt an der Oder during 1954/55 before taking a position as a junior editor and foreign news section leader for Tribüne, the weekly newspaper of the Free German Trade Union Federation (FDGB):  between 1963 and 1967 he served as a member of Tribünes editorial collective.
 
In 1967 Simon was appointed deputy chief editor of Tribüne. In 1975 he was sent to become the Tribünes Bonn correspondent before returning to his position of deputy chief editor, which was now combined with the "Chief Editor for Trades Union Life" position. On 15 September, he was appointed chief editor of Tribüne, in succession to Claus Friedrich, remaining in the post till 1989.

On 23 September 1981, he was co-opted for the 14th session of the FDGB executive committee and elected to membership of its presidium, another function which he retained till 1989.

Awards
 Fritz Heckert Medal (1967)
 Journalists' Prize of the Free German Trade Union Federation (1973)
 Patriotic Order of Merit (Vaterländischer Verdienstorden) in Silver (1977)
 Hermann Duncker Medal (1985)

References

German newspaper journalists
German reporters and correspondents
German male journalists
German trade unionists
Socialist Unity Party of Germany members
German newspaper editors
East German journalists
Recipients of the Patriotic Order of Merit
1933 births
Living people
German male writers
People from Jawor County
People from the Province of Silesia
20th-century German journalists
21st-century German journalists